Sir Julian Beresford King  (born 22 August 1964) is a British diplomat and civil servant who served as the final British European Commissioner from 2016 to 2019, having previously served as the British ambassador to Ireland (2009–2012) and France (2016).

Education
King attended Bishop Vesey's Grammar School, one of the oldest schools in Britain, in Sutton Coldfield. He gained a BA in Philosophy and Theology from St Peter's College, Oxford.

Career
He joined the Foreign and Commonwealth Office in 1985.

After the resignation of Jonathan Hill as the British European Commissioner and European Commissioner for Financial Stability, Financial Services and Capital Markets Union in the aftermath of the Brexit referendum, Prime Minister David Cameron nominated King to replace him. On 2 August 2016, European Commission President Jean-Claude Juncker announced his intention to allocate the new portfolio of Security Union to King. King would work under the supervision of First Vice-President Frans Timmermans. The European Parliament confirmed his appointment on 15 September 2016, and the Council of the European Union did so on 19 September 2016. With the United Kingdom's withdrawal from the European Union on 31 January 2020, he was the last British official to hold a position and portfolio within the European Commission.

Diplomatic career

 1985–1987 Foreign office in London
 1987–1988 
 1989–1990 Private Secretary to the British Ambassador (Sir Ewen Fergusson) in Paris
 1991–1992 worked on European common foreign and security policy (CFSP) in Luxembourg, the Hague, Lisbon then London
 1993–1995 London, working on European defence and NATO issues
 1998–2002 Brussels, working on relations with Turkey, European defence, CFSP and EU enlargement
 2003–2004 Counsellor and Head of Chancery at UK mission to the United Nations in New York City (covering UN Security Council business in the period after the Iraq War)
 2004–2007 UK Permanent Representative to the EU Political and Security Committee in Brussels, covering common foreign and security policy (CFSP).
 2005 Chaired the EU Political and Security Committee during the UK presidency
 2008–2009 Head of the office of the British Commissioner in Brussels (Peter Mandelson then Baroness Ashton). Represented the EU27 on international trade matters, including negotiations on the WTO Doha Round.
 2009–2011 British Ambassador to Ireland. Organised the State Visit to Ireland by Queen Elizabeth in May 2011.
 2011–2014 Director-General of the Northern Ireland Office
 2014–2015 Director-General Economic & Consular Affairs, Foreign and Commonwealth Office
 2016-2016 British Ambassador to France
 2016–2019 European Commissioner for the Security Union

Honours
King was appointed Companion of the Order of St Michael and St George (CMG) in 2006. He was dubbed Knight Commander of the Royal Victorian Order (KCVO) by Queen Elizabeth during a visit to Belfast on 24 June 2014, when he relinquished his appointment as Director-General of the Northern Ireland Office. He was appointed Knight Grand Cross of the Order of St Michael and St George (GCMG) in the 2020 Birthday Honours for services to security in Europe.

Personal life

He married a Danish colleague, Lotte Knudsen in 1992 near Gers in south-west France. They had met as students in Paris and still have a house near where they married. Lotte Knudsen is currently Managing Director, Human Rights, Global & Multilateral Issues in the European External Action Service (EEAS) and previously held senior posts in the European Commission, including as Director for Justice Matters in the Directorate-General for Justice, Freedom and Security

References

External links
 Profile, IrishTimes.com
 The Dogs Trust website, dogstrust.ie
 Sir Julian King KCVO CMG, gov.uk

|-

|-

|-

1964 births
Alumni of St Peter's College, Oxford
Ambassadors of the United Kingdom to France
Ambassadors of the United Kingdom to Ireland
British European Commissioners
École nationale d'administration alumni
Knights Commander of the Royal Victorian Order
Knights Grand Cross of the Order of St Michael and St George
Living people
People educated at Bishop Vesey's Grammar School
People from Sutton Coldfield
European Commissioners 2014–2019